Frank Maloy Anderson (February 3, 1871 – April 26, 1961) was an author, historian and professor of history. He was born in Omaha, Nebraska and spent most of his adult life teaching and writing about American and Western European history. He was a prolific writer for The American Historical Review and is noted among American Civil War historians for his book The Diary of a Public Man.

Life
He taught history at the University of Minnesota in Minneapolis from 1895-1896. The following year he attended Harvard University, Cambridge, Massachusetts from 1896-1897.  He married his first wife Mary G. Steele in 1898, who died in 1938. Their marriage produced one son.
 
Maloy taught history at Dartmouth College, Hanover, N.H. from 1914-1941. He became a member and was Executive Council of the American Association of University Professors from 1917-1920. He was a member and eventual Executive Council of the American Historical Association from 1926-1928. In 1944 he married his second wife, Mary Maud Case.

In 1948 Anderson published Mystery of a "Public Man," a historical detective story regarding quotes made in a diary, known as The Diary of a Public Man, first published in a popular magazine in 1879, quoting people closely associated with Abraham Lincoln, Stephen A. Douglas and William H. Seward just before the Civil War broke out.  The diary's publisher for reasons that are still disputed concealed the identity of its author and has been the center of much debate and controversy regarding the conclusions and surrounding history.

Frank Maloy Anderson died in Saint Paul, Minnesota, on April 26, 1961, at the age of 90, and is buried at Lakewood Cemetery in Minnesota.

Works
List of works by Frank Maloy Anderson
Outlines and Documents of English Constitutional History During the Middle Ages (1895)
Contemporary Opinion of the Virginia and Kentucky Resolutions, (1899)
The Constitutions and Other Select Documents Illustrative of the History of France, 1789–1907 (1908)
 Mystery of a "Public Man," a Historical Detective Story
 
A Syllabus of Modern European History, 1500-1919. With Herbert Darling Foster and Charles Ramsdell Lingley (1919)
Problems in banking and finance. With Isaac Hourwich (1902)

See also
 James Kendall Hosmer American historian and librarian

Sources

 
 , E'book

Further reading
, Book

References

External links
 
 
 The Papers of Frank Maloy Anderson at Dartmouth College Library

1871 births
1961 deaths
Historiographers
Writers from Omaha, Nebraska
Harvard University alumni
University of Minnesota faculty
Dartmouth College faculty
American historians